Shkotovsky District is an administrative and municipal district (raion), one of the twenty-two in Primorsky Krai, Russia. It is located in the south of the krai. Its administrative center is the urban locality (an urban-type settlement) of Smolyaninovo. Population:  The population of Smolyaninovo accounts for 27.4% of the district's total population.

Etymology
Shkotovsky District is named for Nikolay Shkot, a war veteran of the Crimean War who participated in the Siege of Sevastopol, and later an early explorer of Primorsky Krai where he was one of the co-founders of Vladivostok.

Notable residents 

Igor Klimov (born 1989 in Smolyaninovo), footballer
Andrei Kolkoutine (born 1957 in Smolyaninovo), artist

References

Notes

Sources

Districts of Primorsky Krai
